Maxime Macenauer (born January 4, 1989) is a Canadian professional ice hockey forward who is currently an unrestricted free agent. He most recently played for Les Pétroliers du Nord of the Ligue Nord-Américaine de Hockey (LNAH). He has formerly played in the National Hockey League (NHL) with the Anaheim Ducks.

Playing career
Macenauer was selected by the Anaheim Ducks in the 3rd round (63rd overall) of the 2008 NHL Entry Draft. He played four seasons major junior hockey in the Quebec Major Junior Hockey League before turning professional with the Bakersfield Condors of the ECHL in the 2009–10 ECHL season.

With the start of the 2010–11 AHL season, Macenauer was promoted to the Syracuse Crunch, and the following year (2011-12), Macenauer made the Anaheim Ducks out of training camp. He scored his first NHL goal on October 14, 2011, in his third NHL game, against Thomas Greiss of the San Jose Sharks. On February 13, 2012, Macenauer was traded by the Ducks to the Winnipeg Jets in exchange for Riley Holzapfel.

After parts of two seasons with the Jets organization, Macenauer was not tendered a new contract and became a free agent. Unable to garner NHL interest, he accepted a try-out to the Hamilton Bulldogs training camp for the 2013–14 season. On December 13, 2013, Macenauer signed an AHL contract to remain with the Bulldogs for the remainder of the campaign.

In 2015, he took his game overseas, signing with EHC Biel of the Swiss National League A (NLA), where he spent the 2015–16 season tallying nine goals and 18 assists in 43 NLA contests. He agreed to terms with fellow NLA outfit SC Bern in September 2016 and transferred within the league to the SCL Tigers in early January 2017.

Career statistics

Regular season and playoffs

International

References

External links

1989 births
Anaheim Ducks draft picks
Anaheim Ducks players
Bakersfield Condors (1998–2015) players
EHC Biel players
Canadian ice hockey centres
Hamilton Bulldogs (AHL) players
Ice hockey people from Quebec
Living people
Rimouski Océanic players
Rouyn-Noranda Huskies players
SC Bern players
SCL Tigers players
Shawinigan Cataractes players
Sportspeople from Laval, Quebec
St. John's IceCaps players
Syracuse Crunch players
Canadian expatriate ice hockey players in Switzerland